The Candy Kid is a 1928 American silent drama film directed by David Kirkland and starring Rex Lease, Pauline Garon and Frank Campeau.

Cast
 Rex Lease
 Pauline Garon
 Frank Campeau
 Harry Woods
 Roy Stewart
 Charlotte Merriam
 Paul Panzer

References

Bibliography
 Munden, Kenneth White. The American Film Institute Catalog of Motion Pictures Produced in the United States, Part 1. University of California Press, 1997.

External links

1928 films
1928 drama films
Silent American drama films
American silent feature films
1920s English-language films
American black-and-white films
Films directed by David Kirkland
1920s American films